Rudolf Soenning (5 December 1904 – 2 August 1980) was a German bobsledder. He competed in the four-man event at the 1928 Winter Olympics.

References

External links
 

1904 births
1980 deaths
German male bobsledders
Olympic bobsledders of Germany
Bobsledders at the 1928 Winter Olympics
People from Memmingen
Sportspeople from Swabia (Bavaria)
Officers Crosses of the Order of Merit of the Federal Republic of Germany